The 13th Man, also known as The Thirteenth Man, is a 1937 American mystery film directed by William Nigh and starring Weldon Heyburn, Inez Courtney and Selmer Jackson. It was the first film released by the relaunched Monogram Pictures after the studio withdrew from a merger with Republic Pictures.

Plot
Swifty Taylor, a journalist with the Globe Times, hunts for the underworld figure responsible for the killing of a crusading district attorney, murdered by curare-laced dart while attending a prizefight, and of a reporter who had got too close to the truth. Meanwhile, Taylor's secretary, Julie, hopes to persuade him to settle down and marry her.

Cast
Weldon Heyburn as A. "Swifty" Taylor
Inez Courtney as Julie Walters (Swifty's secretary)
Selmer Jackson as Andrew Baldwin (Globe Times publisher)
Matty Fain as Louis Cristy (nightclub owner)
Milburn Stone as Jimmy Moran (Globe Times reporter)
Grace Durkin as Alice Moran (Baldwin's secretary)
Robert Homans as Police Lt. Tom O'Hara
Eadie Adams as Stella Leroy (nightclub singer)
Sidney Payne as "Legs" Henderson (fighter)
Dewey Robinson as Romeo Casanova (radio singer / gym operator)
William Gould as Dist. Atty. Robert E. Sutherland
Warner Richmond as George Crandall the Bookie
Eddie Gribbon as Iron Man' (Swiftys bodyguard)

Soundtrack
 Eadie Adams - "My Topic of Conversation" (Written by Joseph Myro and Milton Royce)

External links

1937 films
1937 mystery films
American mystery films
1930s English-language films
American black-and-white films
Monogram Pictures films
Films directed by William Nigh
1930s American films